Ethmia flavicaudata is a moth in the family Depressariidae. It is found in southern Mexico.

The ground color of the forewings is whitish, mostly replaced by brownish black. The ground color of the hindwings is semitranslucent whitish at the base, becoming brown in the apical area and at the margins. Adults are on wing in April, May and July.

References

Moths described in 1912
flavicaudata